NGC 7610 is a spiral galaxy in the constellation Pegasus. Discovered by Andrew Ainslie Common in August 1880, it was accidentally "rediscovered" by him the same month, and later given the designation NGC 7616.

Supernova
In October 2013 SN 2013fs was discovered in NGC 7610. It was detected approximately 3 hours after the light from the explosion reached Earth, and within a few hours optical spectra were obtained - the earliest such observations ever made of a supernova.

References

External links
 

Spiral galaxies
Pegasus (constellation)
7610
071087
12511